Nicolai Belokosov (born 24 January 1975) is a Moldovan judoka.

Achievements

References

1975 births
Living people
Moldovan male judoka
Place of birth missing (living people)
21st-century Moldovan people